Buckhorn is a census-designated place in Amador County, California. Buckhorn sits at an elevation of 3,238 feet (987 m).  The community is in ZIP code 95666 and area code 209. The 2010 United States census reported Buckhorn's population was 2,429.

Demographics

The 2010 United States Census reported that Buckhorn had a population of 2,429. The racial makeup of Buckhorn was 2,259 (93.0%) White, 9 (0.4%) African American, 37 (1.5%) Native American, 25 (1.0%) Asian, 4 (0.2%) Pacific Islander, 47 (1.9%) from other races, and 48 (2.0%) from two or more races. Hispanic or Latino of any race were 168 persons (6.9%).

The Census reported that 2,429 people (100% of the population) lived in households, 0 (0%) lived in non-institutionalized group quarters, and 0 (0%) were institutionalized.

There were 1,138 households, out of which 202 (17.8%) had children under the age of 18 living in them, 631 (55.4%) were opposite-sex married couples living together, 76 (6.7%) had a female householder with no husband present, 51 (4.5%) had a male householder with no wife present.  There were 65 (5.7%) unmarried opposite-sex partnerships, and 9 (0.8%) same-sex married couples or partnerships. 301 households (26.4%) were made up of individuals, and 148 (13.0%) had someone living alone who was 65 years of age or older. The average household size was 2.13.  There were 758 families (66.6% of all households); the average family size was 2.51.

The population was spread out, with 350 people (14.4%) under the age of 18, 114 people (4.7%) aged 18 to 24, 368 people (15.2%) aged 25 to 44, 896 people (36.9%) aged 45 to 64, and 701 people (28.9%) who were 65 years of age or older.  The median age was 54.9 years. For every 100 females, there were 106.0 males.  For every 100 females age 18 and over, there were 103.0 males.

The homeowner vacancy rate was 3.8%; the rental vacancy rate was 8.6%.  2,001 people (82.4% of the population) lived in owner-occupied housing units and 428 people (17.6%) lived in rental housing units.

Politics

References

Census-designated places in Amador County, California
Census-designated places in California